The Battle of Mobei was a military campaign fought mainly in modern Mongolia. It was part of a major strategic offensive launched by the Han dynasty in January, 119 BC, into the heartland of the nomadic Xiongnu. The campaign was a success for the Han, whose forces led by Wei Qing and Huo Qubing reached as far north as Lake Baikal.

Background

Military tension had for a long time existed in ancient China between Central Plain polities and the northern barbarians, mainly because the fertile lands of the prosperous agricultural civilization presented attractive targets for the militaristic nomadic tribes. Throughout ancient Chinese history, protecting the northern borders from nomadic raids had been a military priority. During  the Zhou dynasty, northern vassal states such as Yan, Zhao and Qin resorted to defensive strategies, constructing elongated fortresses that served as the precursors of the Great Wall of China. During the Qin dynasty, the first emperor Qin Shi Huang conscripted thousands of civilian labourers to perfect the Great Wall in order to reinforce military campaigns along the northern border.

The Han dynasty and the nomadic Xiongnu Empire had a very bitter relationship.  The Xiongnu were initially a group of steppe tribes kept in check by the Qin dynasty's military offensives under General Meng Tian. With the collapse of the Qin dynasty and the Chu-Han contention, the Xiongnu gained the opportunity to become unified under Modu Shanyu and quickly expanded into a powerful tribal confederacy that ruled over a vast territory across Central and East Asia. The Xiongnu then invaded and occupied the fertile Hetao Grassland. When the Chu-Han contention concluded, Emperor Gao recognized the threat posed by its hostile northern neighbour and in 200 BC launched a massive campaign.  After the Han army was lured into an ambush and encircled by 300,000 elite Xiongnu cavalry for seven days, the siege was relieved only after messengers were sent to bribe the Shanyu's wife. Following this failure, the Han emperor realized that the nation, which just recovered from a massive civil war, was not yet strong enough to confront the Xiongnu; therefore, he resorted to the so-called "marriage alliance", or heqin, in order to ease hostility and buy time to strengthen the nation.  Despite the humiliating periodic heqin and giving of gifts, the Han borders were still frequently raided by Xiongnu forces over the next seven decades, however the Han Empire was able to study the behavior of the Xiongnu during this time.

During his reign, Emperor Wu of Han decided that the nation was finally strong enough to solve the Xiongnu problem.  The "peaceful" atmosphere was broken in 133 BC after a large ambush operation was staged at Mayi but aborted after the Xiongnu discovered the trap and retreated.  In 129 BC, the Han forces had their first proper victory against the Xiongnu under the command of the young Wei Qing with a long-distance raid on the Xiongnu holy site at Longcheng (蘢城). Over the next ten years, Emperor Wu repeatedly deployed Wei and his vigorous nephew Huo Qubing against Xiongnu forces thus recapturing large areas of land and dealing devastating blows.

Evicted by the defeats, Yizhixie Chanyu (伊稚邪) took Zhao Xin's advice, and the Xiongnu tribes retreated to the north of the Gobi Desert, hoping that the barren land would serve as a natural barrier against Han offensives.  In 119 BC,  Emperor Wu planned a massive expeditionary campaign.  Chinese forces were deployed in two columns, each consisting of 50,000 cavalry and over 100,000 infantry.  Wei Qing and Huo Qubing served as the supreme commanders, and set off from Dai Prefecture (代郡) and Dingxiang (定襄).

The battles

The initial plan called for Huo Qubing to attack from Dingxiang, but information from a Xiongnu prisoner of war suggested that the Chanyu's main force was deployed to the east at Dai Prefecture, although the information actually proved to be false. Emperor Wu, who had been distancing Wei Qing and giving the younger Huo more attention and favour, ordered the two columns to switch routes in the hope of letting Huo (who was preferentially assigned the most elite troopers) engage the Chanyu.

The Eastern (Dai Prefecture) Theatre
The eastern theatre was quite straightforward, as the Han forces deployed were superior to the opposing Xiongnu forces.

Huo Qubing's forces set off from Dai Prefecture, marched over 1,000 miles and directly engaged the forces of the Xiongnu's Worthy Prince of the East (左賢王, "Wise King of the East"). The battle was swift and decisive, as the Worthy Prince's forces were no match for Huo's elite cavalry. The Huo's army quickly encircled and overran their enemy, killing 70,443 men and capturing three Xiongnu lords and 83 nobles. Huo Qubing's forces suffered a 20% casualty rate but were quickly resupplied locally from their capture. He then went on to conduct a series of rituals upon arrival at the Khentii Mountains (狼居胥山, and the more northern 姑衍山) in order to symbolize the historic Han victory, then continued his pursuit as far as Lake Baikal (瀚海), effectively annihilating the Xiongnu clan.

A separate division led by Lu Bode (路博德), set off on a strategically flanking route from Right Beiping (右北平), joined forces with Huo after arriving in time with 2,800 enemy kills. The combined forces then returned in triumph.

The Western (Dingxiang) Theatre
The western theatre, although setting off with fewer expectations from Emperor Wu, proved more dramatic. Wei Qing's force, set off from Dingxiang, and were comparatively weaker than their eastern counterpart, as its force consisted mainly of leftovers from Huo Qubing's preferential picks for the east. Wei Qing also had other liabilities — he had five generals under his command that expected prestigious assignments, including an old but enthusiastic Li Guang. Li Guang insisted that he wanted a vanguard position as promised by Emperor Wu, but the emperor had secretly messaged Wei to refuse based on the superstition surrounding Li as jinxed with "bad fortune". Wei Qing then assigned Li Guang to combine forces with Zhao Shiqi (赵食其/趙食其) on a barren eastern flanking route, an arrangement that Li protested against and angrily stormed out of the main camp.

The Han army mobilized as planned. After a journey of over 500 miles, they encountered the Chanyu's main forces of 80,000 cavalry. This was unexpected, as the original strategy was to let Huo Qubing's elite troops deal with Chanyu's elite cavalry (the reason that the two Han columns switched routes). The Xiongnu forces, however, had been waiting in anticipation to ambush their adversary. The Han forces, on the other hand, were tired and outnumbered, especially since the Li Guang and Zhao Shiqi's eastern division had not yet arrived on the battlefield. Without hesitation, the Xiongnu charged the Han forces with a 10,000-strong vanguard of cavalry.

Wei Qing recognized the odds against him and quickly took defensive countermeasures. He ordered his troops to arrange heavy-armoured war wagons known as "Wu Gang Chariots" (武刚车/武剛車) into ring formations, creating mobile fortresses that provided archers, crossbowmen and infantry protection from the Xiongnu's powerful cavalry charges, and allowed Han troops to utilize their ranged weapons' advantages of precision. A 5,000-strong force of cavalry was deployed to reinforce the array and eradicate any Xiongnu forces that managed to infiltrate the ringed chariots. This tactic proved effective in countering the momentum of the nomadic cavalry, as the Xiongnu forces were unable to breach the Han army's lines. With the Xiongnu's initial energy neutralized, the battle solidified into a stalemate with neither side making significant gains or losses.

This stalemate lasted until dusk, when a sandstorm obscured the battlefield. Wei Qing used the tactical advantage of the confusion surrounding the sandstorm to send in his main force. The Han cavalry used the low visibility as cover and encircled Chanyu's army from both flanks. The Xiongnu's lines were overwhelmed, and their morale broken by the sight of Han soldiers attacking them in the darkness. Seeing that his forces were completely overrun, the Chanyu escaped under the escort of only a few hundred men. The Han forces killed over 19,000 enemies and pursued the remainder another 100 miles to the Khangai Mountains where they besieged then captured the Fortress of Zhao Xin located in the Orkhon Valley. After a day spent regrouping and receiving fresh supplies, the Han forces burned the stronghold to the ground, before returning in triumph.

Wei Qing's eastern division, commanded by Li Guang and Zhao Shiqi, got lost in the desert and missed the battle entirely, only rejoining the main force on Wei Qing's way home. As a result, Li and Zhao were summoned to a court martial for failing to accomplish orders and putting the battle strategy at risk. Li Guang, frustrated and humiliated as this was his last chance to obtain sufficient battle distinctions to receive a marquessate as a reward, committed suicide to preserve his honour.

For the western theatre, the battle proved strategically decisive. Chanyu's main forces was so badly defeated that they were unable to recover. The Chanyu went missing for over 10 days, resulting in his tribe presuming he was dead and installing a new leader who had to be removed after the Chanyu finally reappeared. The Xiongnu were forced to retreat further north with their threat to the Han Dynasty's northern border largely obliterated.

Aftermath
The costs of the victorious campaigns over the Xiongnu in the ten years from 129 to 119 BC were enormous: the Han army lost almost 80% of their horses on these expeditions, due to combat as well as non-combative losses such as the harsh journey and plague caused by the Xiongnu contaminating the water supply with dead cattle.

Economic pressure on the central Han government led to new taxes being introduced, increasing the burden on average peasants.  The registered population of the Han Empire dropped significantly as a result of famine and excessive taxing to fund military mobilisations.

The Xiongnu, however, suffered an even more lethal blow, as their military losses would reflect directly on their economy.  Apart from loss of manpower due to wartime casualties and diseases, the nomadic Xiongnu lost millions of livestock, their vital food resource, to the Han army, and the war left a large proportion of the remaining cattle suffering miscarriages during their reproductive seasons.

Furthermore, the loss of control over the fertile southern grassland meant that Xiongnu had to hole up in the cold, barren land of the northern Gobi Desert and Siberia, struggling to survive.  As a result, there was a true truce between the Han Dynasty and Xiongnu for seven years, which ended after a Xiongnu raid in 112 BC at Wuyuan.  The Xiongnu, however, never recovered to the strength of their past glory days, and would break apart into smaller clans in the coming decades, ultimately splitting into Southern and Northern branches after a century later, as the Southern branches become the subordinates of the Han Dynasty. With the Northern branches being under attack from the southern branches, the Han empire and other Nomadic tribes such as the Wuhuan and Xianbei,  gain independence from the Xiongnu overlords, forcing the Northern branches to immigrate westward. Eventually, the fleeing Northern branches of Xiongnu became the ancestors of the Huns, which would cause indirect destruction and dissolution of the Western Roman Empire in the following centuries. While others migrated south of central Asia becoming the Xionites, Kidarites, Hephthalites and Nezak Huns, indirectly causing the collapse of the Gupta Empire, and becoming a major burden to the Sassanid Empire.

Notes

References
Ban Gu et al., Hanshu. Beijing: Zhonghua Shuju, 1962. 
Sima Guang, comp. Zizhi Tongjian. Beijing: Zhonghua Shuju, 1956. 
Lin, Gan, "Mobei Zhi Zhan" ("The Battle of Mobei"). Encyclopedia of China, 1st ed.
 Yap, Joseph P. pp 186–194. "Wars With The Xiongnu, A Translation From Zizhi tongjian" AuthorHouse (2009) 

119 BC
Mobei 119 BC
Mobei 119 BC
2nd century BC in China